Franco Boffi (born 2 November 1958) is an Italian former middle distance runner, that won a gold medal at the Summer Universiade (1985).

Biography
He competed in the 1984 Summer Olympics. He was finalist (13th) at the 1987 World Championships in Athletics, but in preliminary round he ran his personal best of ever (8:21:69).

Achievements

National titles
Franco Boffi has won 2 times the individual national championship.
1 win in 3000 metres steeplechase (1984)
1 win in 3000 metres indoor (1987)

See also
Italian all-time lists - 3000 metres steeplechase

References

External links
 

1958 births
Living people
Athletes from Milan
Italian male middle-distance runners
Italian male steeplechase runners
Olympic athletes of Italy
Athletes (track and field) at the 1984 Summer Olympics
World Athletics Championships athletes for Italy
Universiade medalists in athletics (track and field)
Universiade gold medalists for Italy
Medalists at the 1985 Summer Universiade